The Rubaiyat of Dorothy Ashby (subtitled Original compositions inspired by the words of Omar Khayyam, arranged and conducted by Richard Evans) is an album by jazz harpist Dorothy Ashby recorded in late 1969 and early 1970 and released on the Cadet label. On this album, Ashby plays the Japanese musical instrument, the koto, demonstrating her abilities to successfully integrate another instrument into jazz.

Reception

Reviewing the album for AllMusic, Thom Jurek writes: "this is a head record. Time and space are suspended and new dimensions open up for anyone willing to take this killer little set on and let it spill its magic into the mind canal through the ears. Depending on how much of a jazz purist you are will give you a side to debate the place of this set in Ashby's catalogue. For those who remain open, this may be her greatest moment on record …"

A reviewer of Dusty Groove stated "Incredible work from the amazing Dorothy Ashby – a brilliant set of funky and spiritual tunes, set to full backings from Chicago soul arranger Richard Evans! This album is easily one of Ashby's greatest, and it's dedicated to the writings of Omar Khayyam – one of the forces guiding Dorothy's more spiritual sound at the end of the 60s, clearly opened up in a way that's not unlike the direction of Alice Coltrane's work, but a lot more focused and a lot more funky! Ashby not only plays her usual jazz harp, but also koto as well, and even sings a bit too – and the larger group directed by Evans features work by Stu Katz on vibes and kalimba, Lenny Druss on flutes, and Cash McCall on guitar – all in a groove that's really a precursor to the Earth Wind & Fire generation of the Chicago scene!"

Track listing 
All compositions by Dorothy Ashby.
 "Myself When Young" - 5:16   
 "For Some We Loved" - 4:02   
 "Wax and Wane" - 4:25   
 "Drink" - 2:30   
 "Wine" - 3:56   
 "Dust" - 2:51   
 "Joyful Grass and Grape" - 3:38   
 "Shadow Shapes" - 3:32   
 "Heaven and Hell" - 3:10   
 "The Moving Finger" - 5:39

Personnel 
Dorothy Ashby – harp, koto, vocals
Lenny Druss – flute, oboe, piccolo flute (tracks 1-5 & 10) 
Cliff Davis – alto saxophone (track 10)
Stu Katz – vibraphone (tracks 1, 3, 4, 6 & 8-10)
Cash McCall – guitar (track 10)
Fred Katz –  kalimba (tracks 2, 3 & 10)
Ed Green – violin (track 2)
Unidentified orchestra arranged and conducted by Richard Evans

References

External links
A Dorothy Ashby Discography

Dorothy Ashby albums
1970 albums
Cadet Records albums